Trigonopterus fulgidus is a species of flightless weevil in the genus Trigonopterus from Indonesia.

Etymology
The specific name is derived from the Latin word fulgidus, meaning "shining" or "gleaming".

Description
Individuals measure 2.38–3.78 mm in length.  The legs, head, and underside are rust-colored, with a reddish- or greenish-copper colored pronotum and elytra.

Range

Phylogeny
T. fulgidus is part of the T. dimorphus species group.

References

fulgidus
Beetles described in 2014
Beetles of Asia
Insects of Indonesia